Mansukh Chaturvedi ki Atmakatha (transi: Autobiography of Mansukh Chaturvedi) is a 2019 Indian Comedy film directed and produced by Sachin Gupta under Chilsag Entertainment Network. It is produced by Sachin Gupta and Sushma Gupta. The film stars Sandeep Singh, Sikander Khan and Monika in the lead roles.

Plot 
Mansukh the protagonist is from Etawah. He rules the hearts of his neighbours and is a heartthrob of his city with his head in the clouds. He dreams of being a big superstar in Mumbai, despite his father's concerns and his girlfriend, Munia's constant attempts to bring his head out of the clouds. However, for Mansukh, dreaming about being the 'Raving Hollywood star-Mansukh' is not new to his unreal world. The story revolves around a small town boy's dreams to be the superstar of the silver screen and the star of all hearts and the struggle of Mansukh's father with the help of Munia's efforts to make Mansukh realise the reality of the path he is on. In this comic trail of events we see what path Mansukh chooses for himself.

The film is based on a play called 'Dear Madhav' and was released all India.

Cast 

 Sandeep Singh as Mansukh Chaturvedi
 Anamika Shukla as Buaji
 Monika as Muniya
 Sikander Khan as Mansukh's father
 Vishal as casting guy
 Anushka as actor 1
 Desiree as actor 2
 Megha as Mansukh's mother
 Subrato as Paanwala

Music 
The music for the film was composed by Shivang Mathur along with lyricist Shayra Apoorva.

References 

Hindi-language comedy films
2010s Hindi-language films